The assembly of Catholic bishops in the Republic of Congo is the Episcopal Conference of the Congo (French: Conférence Épiscopale du Congo, CEC).
The CEC is a member of the Association of Episcopal Conferences of the Region of Central Africa and the Symposium of Episcopal Conferences of Africa and Madagascar (SECAM).

The conference elects its president to a three-year term.

List of presidents of the Bishops' Conference:

1970 - 1971: Théophile Mbemba, Archbishop of Brazzaville
1971 - 1977: Emile Biayenda, Archbishop of Brazzaville
1981 - 1986: Georges-Firmin Singha, Bishop of Owando
1986 - 1993: Barthélémy Batantu, Archbishop of Brazzaville
1993 - 1997: Bernard Nsayi, Bishop of Nkayi
1997 - 2003: Anatole Milandou, Archbishop of Brazzaville
2003 - 2006: Ernest Kombo, Bishop of Owando
2006 - 2015: Louis Portella Mbuyu, Bishop of Kinkala
2015 - present: Daniel Mizonzo, Bishop of Nkayi

References

External links
 
 http://www.gcatholic.org/dioceses/country/CG.htm
 http://www.catholic-hierarchy.org/country/cg.html 

Congo
Catholic Church in the Republic of the Congo

it:Chiesa_cattolica_nella_Repubblica_del_Congo#Conferenza_episcopale